Ampelocissus gracilipes, also known as abourbee (Akan-Twi), is a climbing vine or liana in the Grape family of tropical western Africa (Ghana to Liberia), in densely vegetative, forested areas.

The stems which are semi-woody, thick and sturdy, but not very hard, start out with a dense covering of washy-brown hairs, giving way over time to a complexion of small warts. Both flowers and fruits are red.

Uses
The stem sap is potable and abundant, and can be drunk like water. The fruits, whether they have ripened or not, are also edible, but are not consumed in great quantity.

References

External links
 Specimen JPG from Aluka.org

gracilipes
Plants described in 1905
Flora of Liberia
Flora of Ghana